Brevicoryne is a genus of aphid insect that contains many species which are agricultural pests.

Hosts
This genus parasitizes a wide range of hosts, with many members of the Brassicaceae (broccoli, cabbage, kale, etc.) included.

Adults
Adults are distinguished from the nymphs by their darker body. They may (alate) or may not exhibit wings.

Parasites
Many species of wasps parasitize the juvenile (nymph); injecting their eggs using their ovipositor creating 'mummies' (so called because of their desiccated appearance).

Species
 Brevicoryne arctica Richards, 1963
 Brevicoryne barbareae Nevsky 1929
 Brevicoryne brassicae Linnaeus, 1758, the cabbage aphid
 Brevicoryne crambe Bozhko, 1950
 Brevicoryne crambinistataricae Bozhko, 1953
 Brevicoryne fraterna Strom, 1938
 Brevicoryne jiayuguanensis Zhang, Chen, Zhong & Li, 1999
 Brevicoryne lonicerina Mukh & Akhm, 1980
 Brevicoryne nigrosiphunculata Hodjat, 1981
 Brevicoryne shaposhnikovi Narzikulov, 1957

See also
Pest (organism)
Biodiversity
IPM

Notes

Sources
 
 

Sternorrhyncha genera
Macrosiphini